Family Portrait in Black and White is a Canadian-Ukrainian coproduced documentary film, directed by Julia Ivanova and released in 2011. The film profiles Olga Nenya, a Ukrainian woman who has adopted a large family of biracial children, and tries to protect them from the sometimes virulent anti-African racism of rural Ukrainian society.

The film premiered at the 2011 Sundance Film Festival. It had its Canadian premiere at the 2011 Hot Docs Canadian International Documentary Festival, where it won the award for Best Canadian Feature Documentary .

It was a shortlisted Genie Award nominee for Best Feature Length Documentary at the 32nd Genie Awards in 2012.

References

External links
 

2011 films
Canadian documentary films
Ukrainian documentary films
2011 documentary films
Documentary films about families
Ukrainian-language films
2010s Canadian films